Foscoe is an unincorporated community and census-designated place in Watauga County, North Carolina, United States.  The community is located on NC 105, southwest of Boone.

The community is between Seven Devils and Shulls Mill.   Multiple shops dot the main highway, serving a tourist clientele.  Its development, since the 1980s, is thanks to year-round tourism to nearby attractions, notably Grandfather Mountain.

Historically, the East Tennessee and Western North Carolina Railroad (Nicknamed "Tweetsie") passed through the area until flooding destroyed the tracks in 1940.  In 1956, NC 105 was built over the original rail bed.

Demographics

See also
 Blue Ridge Parkway
 Flattop Mountain
 Hanging Rock
 Peak Mountain
 Sugar Mountain
 Watauga River

References

Unincorporated communities in North Carolina
Unincorporated communities in Watauga County, North Carolina
Census-designated places in Watauga County, North Carolina
Census-designated places in North Carolina